One Lincoln Park is a residential tower in Denver, reaching 32 stories and 
.  The building sits at the edge of the downtown grid and is bounded by Welton St, 20th St, Lincoln St, and 20th Ave.

External links
Official Site

References

Residential skyscrapers in Denver
Residential condominiums in the United States